Crawford-Whitehead-Ross House is a historic home located at Madison, Jefferson County, Indiana. It was built about 1833, and is a two-story, Federal style brick dwelling with a side hall plan.  The house was enlarged about 1852-1853 modified about 1871 in the Italianate style with the addition of metal window detailing and an elaborate cornice.

It was listed on the National Register of Historic Places in 1992. It is located in the Madison Historic District.

References

Houses on the National Register of Historic Places in Indiana
Federal architecture in Indiana
Italianate architecture in Indiana
Houses completed in 1833
Houses in Jefferson County, Indiana
National Register of Historic Places in Jefferson County, Indiana
Historic district contributing properties in Indiana